The Ivy was a planned skyscraper in Monterrey, Mexico.  The tower was going  to be located in the upscale Valle Oriente sector.  When complete, it will be the tallest building in the Monterrey area and, depending upon exact final height and definition being used, could challenge the Torre Bicentenario as the tallest building in Mexico. Torre Fundadores will be a mixed-use project, providing retail, commercial office, hotel and residential space.  While detailed plans for the edifice exist, the project has yet to be approved by local authorities.

Description
Torre Fundadores (now The Ivy) will actually be a pair of towers arising from a common base building. The shorter tower is a standard, rectangular efficient shape (office towers). The taller tower is more architecturally unique, appearing as a twisted tower narrowing toward the top. The design does not call for significant spires or antennae. The remainder will consist of 236 luxury residences and a boutique hotel composed of over 150 rooms. The tower will also feature an underground parking garage with a capacity of 2,000 vehicles.

References

External links
 Orange Investments official website

Unbuilt buildings and structures in Mexico
Skyscrapers in Mexico